Mew gull has been split into the following two species:
 Common gull, Larus canus
 Short-billed gull, Larus brachyrhynchus

The name can also refer to:
 Percival Mew Gull, 1930s British racing aircraft

Birds by common name